The Seattle Mariners 1996 season was their 20th season, and the team was the runner-up in American League West, with a record of  4½ games behind the champion Texas Rangers. The Mariners led the majors in runs (993), doubles (335), runs batted in (954), and slugging percentage (.484), but the pitching staff had the highest earned run average (5.21) in team history. Four Mariners scored at least 100 runs and four drove in at least 100 runs. In their game against the Kansas City Royals on May 11, the Mariners set a franchise record of 12 extra-base hits.

Offseason
 November 29, 1995: Mike Blowers was traded by the Mariners to the Los Angeles Dodgers for Willis Otañez and Miguel Cairo.
 January 23, 1996: Aaron Small was selected off waivers by the Mariners from the Florida Marlins.
 January 29, 1996: Aaron Small was selected off waivers from the Mariners by the Oakland Athletics.
 March 25, 1996: Ricky Jordan was purchased by the Mariners from the California Angels.

Regular season

Season standings

Record vs. opponents

Game log

|- bgcolor="ccffcc"
| 1 || March 31 || White Sox || 3–2 (12) || Hurtado (1–0) || Simas || — || 57,467 || 1–0
|-

|- bgcolor="ccffcc"
| 2 || April 2 || White Sox || 3–2 || Hitchcock (1–0) || Alvarez || Charlton (1) || 38,570 || 2–0
|- bgcolor="ffbbbb"
| 3 || April 3 || White Sox || 2–4 || Magrane || Wolcott (0–1) || Hernandez || 22,783 || 2–1
|- bgcolor="ffbbbb"
| 4 || April 5 || Brewers || 6–10 || Karl || Hurtado (1–1) || — || 27,768 || 2–2
|- bgcolor="ccffcc"
| 5 || April 6 || Brewers || 8–5 || Johnson (1–0) || Sparks || — || 56,892 || 3–2
|- bgcolor="ccffcc"
| 6 || April 7 || Brewers || 3–1 || Hitchcock (2–0) || Bones || Jackson (1) || 21,004 || 4–2
|- bgcolor="ffbbbb"
| 7 || April 9 || @ Tigers || 9–10 || Keagle || Menhart (0–1) || Williams || 42,932 || 4–3
|- bgcolor="ffbbbb"
| 8 || April 10 || @ Tigers || 3–7 || Olivares || Hurtado (1–2) || — || 9,299 || 4–4
|- bgcolor="ccffcc"
| 9 || April 11 || @ Tigers || 9–1 || Johnson (2–0) || Gohr || — || 12,272 || 5–4
|- bgcolor="ccffcc"
| 10 || April 12 || @ Blue Jays || 9–6 || Hitchcock (3–0) || Quantrill || — || 31,293 || 6–4
|- bgcolor="ccffcc"
| 11 || April 13 || @ Blue Jays || 14–3 || Bosio (1–0) || Ware || — || 33,645 || 7–4
|- bgcolor="ccffcc"
| 12 || April 14 || @ Blue Jays || 9–4 || Wolcott (1–1) || Hentgen || — || 29,301 || 8–4
|- bgcolor="ccffcc"
| 13 || April 15 || Angels || 11–10 || Charlton (1–0) || Eichhorn || — || 36,960 || 9–4
|- bgcolor="ccffcc"
| 14 || April 16 || Angels || 5–3 || Johnson (3–0) || Abbott || — || 25,404 || 10–4
|- bgcolor="ccffcc"
| 15 || April 17 || Tigers || 8–3 || Jackson (1–0) || Veres || — || 18,008 || 11–4
|- bgcolor="ccffcc"
| 16 || April 18 || Tigers || 11–3 || Bosio (2–0) || Sodowsky || Hurtado (1) || 17,536 || 12–4
|- bgcolor="ffbbbb"
| 17 || April 19 || Blue Jays || 4–10 || Hentgen || Wolcott (1–2) || Bohanon || 32,189 || 12–5
|- bgcolor="ffbbbb"
| 18 || April 20 || Blue Jays || 1–3 || Guzman || Menhart (0–2) || Timlin || 47,487 || 12–6
|- bgcolor="ccffcc"
| 19 || April 21 || Blue Jays || 9–5 || Johnson (4–0) || Hanson || — || 34,915 || 13–6
|- bgcolor="ffbbbb"
| 20 || April 22 || Blue Jays || 7–16 || Castillo || Hurtado (1–3) || — || 18,467 || 13–7
|- bgcolor="ffbbbb"
| 21 || April 24 || @ White Sox || 1–2 || Alvarez || Bosio (2–1) || Hernandez || 15,882 || 13–8
|- bgcolor="ffbbbb"
| 22 || April 25 || @ White Sox || 3–4 || Tapani || Wolcott (1–3) || Hernandez || 14,679 || 13–9
|- bgcolor="ccffcc"
| 23 || April 26 || @ Brewers || 6–5 || Carmona (1–0) || Potts || Charlton (2) || 13,072 || 14–9
|- bgcolor="ccffcc"
| 24 || April 27 || @ Brewers || 6–5 || Wells (1–0) || Bones || Charlton (3) || 17,270 || 15–9
|- bgcolor="ffbbbb"
| 25 || April 28 || @ Brewers || 9–16 || Potts || Davis (0–1) || — || 19,717 || 15–10
|- bgcolor="ccffcc"
| 26 || April 30 || @ Rangers || 8–0 || Bosio (3–1) || Gross || — || 27,272 || 16–10
|-

|- bgcolor="ffbbbb"
| 27 || May 1 || @ Rangers || 4–5 || Russell || Jackson (1–1) || Henneman || 31,775 || 16–11
|- bgcolor="ffbbbb"
| 28 || May 2 || Indians || 4–6 || Hershiser || Wolcott (1–4) || Mesa || 21,711 || 16–12
|- bgcolor="ffbbbb"
| 29 || May 3 || Indians || 2–5 || Nagy || Hitchcock (3–1) || Mesa || 38,086 || 16–13
|- bgcolor="ccffcc"
| 30 || May 4 || Indians || 5–1 || Menhart (1–2) || Lopez || — || 57,133 || 17–13
|- bgcolor="ffbbbb"
| 31 || May 5 || Indians || 0–2 || Martinez || Bosio (3–2) || Mesa || 56,883 || 17–14
|- bgcolor="ccffcc"
| 32 || May 6 || Twins || 5–4 || Wells (2–0) || Radke || Charlton (4) || 32,203 || 18–14
|- bgcolor="ffbbbb"
| 33 || May 7 || Twins || 0–2 || Parra || Wolcott (1–5) || Stevens || 15,626 || 18–15
|- bgcolor="ffbbbb"
| 34 || May 8 || Twins || 5–7 (10) || Guardado || Wells (2–1) || Stevens || 22,175 || 18–16
|- bgcolor="ffbbbb"
| 35 || May 10 || Royals || 10–14 || Valera || Davis (0–2) || — || 24,231 || 18–17
|- bgcolor="ccffcc"
| 36 || May 11 || Royals || 11–1 || Wolcott (2–5) || Belcher || Carmona (1) || 43,297 || 19–17
|- bgcolor="ccffcc"
| 37 || May 12 || Royals || 8–5 || Johnson (5–0) || Linton || Charlton (5) || 27,470 || 20–17
|- bgcolor="ffbbbb"
| 38 || May 14 || @ Yankees || 0–2 || Gooden || Hitchcock (3–2) || — || 20,786 || 20–18
|- bgcolor="ccffcc"
| 39 || May 15 || @ Yankees || 10–5 || Hurtado (2–3) || Key || — || 20,680 || 21–18
|- bgcolor="ffbbbb"
| 40 || May 17 || @ Orioles || 13–14 || Mills || Charlton (1–1) || — || 47,259 || 21–19
|- bgcolor="ccffcc"
| 41 || May 18 || @ Orioles || 7–3 || Milacki (1–0) || Mercker || — || 46,434 || 22–19
|- bgcolor="ffbbbb"
| 42 || May 19 || @ Orioles || 7–8 || Mussina || Hurtado (2–4) || Myers || 47,565 || 22–20
|- bgcolor="ccffcc"
| 43 || May 21 || @ Red Sox || 13–7 || Wells (3–1) || Eshelman || — || 24,528 || 23–20
|- bgcolor="ccffcc"
| 44 || May 22 || @ Red Sox || 6–1 || Wolcott (3–5) || Wakefield || — || 26,753 || 24–20
|- bgcolor="ffbbbb"
| 45 || May 23 || @ Red Sox || 4–11 || Clemens || Milacki (1–1) || — || 31,551 || 24–21
|- bgcolor="ccffcc"
| 46 || May 24 || Yankees || 10–4 || Hitchcock (4–2) || Kamieniecki || — || 44,236 || 25–21
|- bgcolor="ffbbbb"
| 47 || May 25 || Yankees || 4–5 || Mendoza || Hurtado (2–5) || Wetteland || 57,173 || 25–22
|- bgcolor="ccffcc"
| 48 || May 26 || Yankees || 4–3 || Menhart (2–2) || Gooden || Charlton (6) || 42,410 || 26–22
|- bgcolor="ffbbbb"
| 49 || May 28 || Orioles || 8–12 || Rhodes || Guetterman (0–1) || Haynes || 23,235 || 26–23
|- bgcolor="ccffcc"
| 50 || May 29 || Orioles || 9–8 || Charlton (2–1) || Myers || — || 20,253 || 27–23
|- bgcolor="ffbbbb"
| 51 || May 30 || Red Sox || 1–10 || Gordon || Torres (0–1) || — || 17,395 || 27–24
|- bgcolor="ccffcc"
| 52 || May 31 || Red Sox || 9–6 || Wells (4–1) || Garces || — || 29,119 || 28–24
|-

|- bgcolor="ffbbbb"
| 53 || June 1 || Red Sox || 5–6 || Wakefield || Milacki (1–2) || Slocumb || 34,822 || 28–25
|- bgcolor="ccffcc"
| 54 || June 2 || Red Sox || 3–1 || Wolcott (4–5) || Clemens || Jackson (2) || 47,540 || 29–25
|- bgcolor="ccffcc"
| 55 || June 4 || @ Indians || 10–7 || Carmona (2–0) || Mesa || Charlton (7) || 42,179 || 30–25
|- bgcolor="ffbbbb"
| 56 || June 5 || @ Indians || 5–13 || Plunk || Milacki (1–3) || — || 42,274 || 30–26
|- bgcolor="ccffcc"
| 57 || June 6 || @ Indians || 5–2 || Wells (5–1) || Martinez || Charlton (8) || 42,236 || 31–26
|- bgcolor="ffbbbb"
| 58 || June 7 || @ Royals || 5–9 || Valera || Wolcott (4–6) || — || 20,891 || 31–27
|- bgcolor="ffbbbb"
| 59 || June 8 || @ Royals || 8–12 || Appier || Milacki (1–4) || Montgomery || 30,022 || 31–28
|- bgcolor="ccffcc"
| 60 || June 9 || @ Royals || 3–2 || Hitchcock (5–2) || Gubicza || Charlton (9) || 20,489 || 32–28
|- bgcolor="ffbbbb"
| 61 || June 10 || @ Twins || 6–13 || Aldred || Wagner (0–1) || Trombley || 17,134 || 32–29
|- bgcolor="ccffcc"
| 62 || June 11 || @ Twins || 18–8 || Wells (6–1) || Aguilera || Hurtado (2) || 14,395 || 33–29
|- bgcolor="ccffcc"
| 63 || June 12 || @ Twins || 5–3 || Wolcott (5–6) || Radke || Charlton (10) || 15,830 || 34–29
|- bgcolor="ffbbbb"
| 64 || June 14 || White Sox || 1–4 || Alvarez || Hitchcock (5–3) || Hernandez || 30,163 || 34–30
|- bgcolor="ccffcc"
| 65 || June 15 || White Sox || 8–6 (12) || Carmona (3–0) || McCaskill || — || 47,042 || 35–30
|- bgcolor="ccffcc"
| 66 || June 16 || White Sox || 7–6 || Wells (7–1) || Magrane || Jackson (3) || 34,588 || 36–30
|- bgcolor="ffbbbb"
| 67 || June 18 || Blue Jays || 3–11 || Guzman || Wolcott (5–7) || — || 25,912 || 36–31
|- bgcolor="ffbbbb"
| 68 || June 19 || Blue Jays || 2–9 || Hanson || Harikkala (0–1) || — || 26,265 || 36–32
|- bgcolor="ccffcc"
| 69 || June 20 || @ White Sox || 8–5 || Hitchcock (6–3) || Tapani || Charlton (11) || 23,017 || 37–32
|- bgcolor="ccffcc"
| 70 || June 21 || @ White Sox || 12–2 || Wagner (1–1) || Magrane || — || 23,253 || 38–32
|- bgcolor="ccffcc"
| 71 || June 22 || @ White Sox || 4–2 || Wells (8–1) || Fernandez || Charlton (12) || 27,036 || 39–32
|- bgcolor="ffbbbb"
| 72 || June 23 || @ White Sox || 6–7 (10) || McCaskill || Guetterman (0–2) || — || 26,768 || 39–33
|- bgcolor="ffbbbb"
| 73 || June 25 || @ Blue Jays || 7–8 || Crabtree || Charlton (2–2) || — || 31,420 || 39–34
|- bgcolor="ffbbbb"
| 74 || June 26 || @ Blue Jays || 5–6 || Ware || Ayala (0–1) || Crabtree || 30,158 || 39–35
|- bgcolor="ccffcc"
| 75 || June 27 || @ Blue Jays || 9–1 || Wells (9–1) || Quantrill || — || 31,108 || 40–35
|- bgcolor="ccffcc"
| 76 || June 28 || Rangers || 19–8 || Carmona (4–0) || Pavlik || — || 34,413 || 41–35
|- bgcolor="ffbbbb"
| 77 || June 29 || Rangers || 5–9 || Oliver || Meacham (0–1) || — || 37,556 || 41–36
|- bgcolor="ccffcc"
| 78 || June 30 || Rangers || 4–3 || Hitchcock (7–3) || Witt || Charlton (13) || 33,392 || 42–36
|-

|- bgcolor="ffbbbb"
| 79 || July 1 || Athletics || 4–6 || Wengert || Wagner (1–2) || Taylor || 18,166 || 42–37
|- bgcolor="ffbbbb"
| 80 || July 2 || Athletics || 6–11 || Mohler || Charlton (2–3) || — || 19,632 || 42–38
|- bgcolor="ccffcc"
| 81 || July 3 || Athletics || 4–3 || Ayala (1–1) || Reyes || — || 36,619 || 43–38
|- bgcolor="ccffcc"
| 82 || July 4 || @ Rangers || 9–5 || Carmona (5–0) || Henneman || — || 46,668 || 44–38
|- bgcolor="ccffcc"
| 83 || July 5 || @ Rangers || 6–3 || Hitchcock (8–3) || Witt || — || 46,397 || 45–38
|- bgcolor="ccffcc"
| 84 || July 6 || @ Rangers || 9–5 || Wagner (2–2) || Gross || — || 46,458 || 46–38
|- bgcolor="ffbbbb"
| 85 || July 7 || @ Rangers || 3–8 || Hill || Wells (9–2) || — || 36,933 || 46–39
|- bgcolor="ccffcc"
| 86 || July 11 || Angels || 5–4 (12) || Carmona (6–0) || Monteleone || — || 25,949 || 47–39
|- bgcolor="ccffcc"
| 87 || July 12 || Angels || 7–6 (10) || Ayala (2–1) || McElroy || — || 29,618 || 48–39
|- bgcolor="ffbbbb"
| 88 || July 13 || Angels || 4–6 || Boskie || Ayala (2–2) || Percival || 37,792 || 48–40
|- bgcolor="ccffcc"
| 89 || July 14 || Angels || 8–0 || Wells (10–2) || Grimsley || — || 33,243 || 49–40
|- bgcolor="ccffcc"
| 90 || July 15 || @ Athletics || 5–1 || Wolcott (6–7) || Telgheder || — || 11,183 || 50–40
|- bgcolor="ffbbbb"
| 91 || July 16 || @ Athletics || 5–12 || Chouinard || Hitchcock (8–4) || — || 15,206 || 50–41
|- bgcolor="ffbbbb"
| 92 || July 17 || @ Athletics || 6–7 || Corsi || Minor (0–1) || Taylor || 14,387 || 50–42
|- bgcolor="ccffcc"
| 93 || July 18 || @ Angels || 15–3 || Meacham (1–1) || Boskie || — || 22,780 || 51–42
|- bgcolor="ffbbbb"
| 94 || July 19 || @ Angels || 4–9 || Grimsley || Wells (10–3) || — || 23,332 || 51–43
|- bgcolor="ffbbbb"
| 95 || July 20 || @ Angels || 4–5 || Schmidt || Charlton (2–4) || Percival || 31,759 || 51–44
|- bgcolor="ccffcc"
| 96 || July 21 || @ Angels || 6–2 || Hitchcock (9–4) || Abbott || — || 22,088 || 52–44
|- bgcolor="ccffcc"
| 97 || July 22 || Brewers || 8–3 || Wagner (3–2) || Mercedes || — || 40,555 || 53–44
|- bgcolor="ffbbbb"
| 98 || July 23 || Brewers || 3–7 || Karl || Carmona (6–1) || — || 22,378 || 53–45
|- bgcolor="ccffcc"
| 99 || July 24 || Brewers || 8–7 || Ayala (3–2) || Fetters || — || 19,899 || 54–45
|- bgcolor="ffbbbb"
| 100 || July 25 || Tigers || 4–7 (10) || Lima || Ayala (3–3) || — || 19,949 || 54–46
|- bgcolor="ccffcc"
| 101 || July 26 || Tigers || 6–4 || Hitchcock (10–4) || Sager || Jackson (4) || 25,175 || 55–46
|- bgcolor="ccffcc"
| 102 || July 27 || Tigers || 13–7 || Davis (1–2) || Williams || — || 43,209 || 56–46
|- bgcolor="ffbbbb"
| 103 || July 28 || Tigers || 6–14 || Olivares || Bosio (3–3) || — || 38,204 || 56–47
|- bgcolor="ccffcc"
| 104 || July 30 || @ Brewers || 6–5 || Wells (11–3) || Eldred || Ayala (1) || — || 57–47
|- bgcolor="ffbbbb"
| 105 || July 30 || @ Brewers || 3–4 || Van Egmond || Wolcott (6–8) || Fetters || 18,591 || 57–48
|- bgcolor="ccffcc"
| 106 || July 31 || @ Brewers || 9–3 || Hitchcock (11–4) || D'Amico || — || 30,772 || 58–48
|-

|- bgcolor="ccffcc"
| 107 || August 1 || @ Brewers || 9–2 || Moyer (1–0) || McDonald || — || 18,425 || 59–48
|- bgcolor="ffbbbb"
| 108 || August 2 || @ Tigers || 2–8 || Olivares || Wagner (3–3) || — || 23,405 || 59–49
|- bgcolor="ffbbbb"
| 109 || August 3 || @ Tigers || 3–6 || Olson || Charlton (2–5) || — || 25,928 || 59–50
|- bgcolor="ccffcc"
| 110 || August 4 || @ Tigers || 9–3 || Wolcott (7–8) || Nitkowski || — || 23,569 || 60–50
|- bgcolor="ffbbbb"
| 111 || August 6 || Indians || 3–4 || Lopez || Wells (11–4) || Mesa || 31,472 || 60–51
|- bgcolor="ffbbbb"
| 112 || August 7 || Indians || 4–5 || Tavarez || Charlton (2–6) || Mesa || 30,431 || 60–52
|- bgcolor="ffbbbb"
| 113 || August 8 || Indians || 1–2 || Ogea || Mulholland (0–1) || Mesa || 36,822 || 60–53
|- bgcolor="ffbbbb"
| 114 || August 9 || Twins || 5–6 || Parra || Wolcott (7–9) || Rodriguez || 25,130 || 60–54
|- bgcolor="ffbbbb"
| 115 || August 10 || Twins || 4–10 || Klingenbeck || Hitchcock (11–5) || — || 34,381 || 60–55
|- bgcolor="ffbbbb"
| 116 || August 11 || Twins || 3–6 || Radke || Wells (11–5) || Rodriguez || 36,114 || 60–56
|- bgcolor="ffbbbb"
| 117 || August 12 || Royals || 4–10 || Appier || Moyer (1–1) || Huisman || 43,476 || 60–57
|- bgcolor="ccffcc"
| 118 || August 13 || Royals || 9–5 || Mulholland (1–1) || Linton || Johnson (1) || 21,961 || 61–57
|- bgcolor="ffbbbb"
| 119 || August 14 || Royals || 1–3 || Rosado || Wolcott (7–10) || Montgomery || 23,709 || 61–58
|- bgcolor="ccffcc"
| 120 || August 16 || @ Yankees || 6–5 || Hitchcock (12–5) || Polley || Jackson (5) || 50,724 || 62–58
|- bgcolor="ccffcc"
| 121 || August 17 || @ Yankees || 10–3 || Moyer (2–1) || Rogers || — || 51,729 || 63–58
|- bgcolor="ccffcc"
| 122 || August 18 || @ Yankees || 13–12 (12) || Ayala (4–3) || Mecir || Jackson (6) || 44,769 || 64–58
|- bgcolor="ffbbbb"
| 123 || August 19 || @ Yankees || 4–10 || Pettitte || Carmona (6–2) || — || 33,994 || 64–59
|- bgcolor="ffbbbb"
| 124 || August 20 || @ Orioles || 1–4 || Mussina || Wagner (3–4) || Myers || 47,679 || 64–60
|- bgcolor="ffbbbb"
| 125 || August 21 || @ Orioles || 5–10 || Erickson || Hitchcock (12–6) || — || 47,198 || 64–61
|- bgcolor="ccffcc"
| 126 || August 22 || @ Orioles || 10–3 || Moyer (3–1) || Coppinger || — || 47,380 || 65–61
|- bgcolor="ccffcc"
| 127 || August 23 || @ Red Sox || 6–4 || Bosio (4–3) || Brandenburg || Ayala (2) || 33,079 || 66–61
|- bgcolor="ffbbbb"
| 128 || August 24 || @ Red Sox || 5–9 || Lacy || Wells (11–6) || — || 32,928 || 66–62
|- bgcolor="ffbbbb"
| 129 || August 25 || @ Red Sox || 5–8 || Maddux || Wagner (3–5) || Slocumb || 34,377 || 66–63
|- bgcolor="ccffcc"
| 130 || August 26 || Yankees || 2–1 || Ayala (5–3) || Lloyd || Charlton (14) || 32,857 || 67–63
|- bgcolor="ccffcc"
| 131 || August 27 || Yankees || 7–4 || Moyer (4–1) || Lloyd || — || 32,975 || 68–63
|- bgcolor="ccffcc"
| 132 || August 28 || Yankees || 10–2 || Mulholland (2–1) || Gooden || — || 30,952 || 69–63
|- bgcolor="ccffcc"
| 133 || August 29 || Orioles || 9–6 || Charlton (3–6) || Myers || — || 24,915 || 70–63
|- bgcolor="ffbbbb"
| 134 || August 30 || Orioles || 2–5 || Coppinger || Hitchcock (12–7) || Mills || 44,532 || 70–64
|- bgcolor="ffbbbb"
| 135 || August 31 || Orioles || 6–7 || Erickson || Bosio (4–4) || Benitez || 42,092 || 70–65
|-

|- bgcolor="ccffcc"
| 136 || September 1 || Orioles || 5–1 || Mulholland (3–1) || Wells || — || 50,015 || 71–65
|- bgcolor="ffbbbb"
| 137 || September 2 || Red Sox || 8–9 (10) || Slocumb || Carmona (6–3) || — || 24,470 || 71–66
|- bgcolor="ccffcc"
| 138 || September 3 || Red Sox || 11–9 || Torres (1–1) || Gordon || Charlton (15) || 17,374 || 72–66
|- bgcolor="ffbbbb"
| 139 || September 4 || Red Sox || 5–7 || Mahomes || Hitchcock (12–8) || Slocumb || 22,642 || 72–67
|- bgcolor="ffbbbb"
| 140 || September 8 || @ Indians || 1–2 || Nagy || Mulholland (3–2) || — || 42,307 || 72–68
|- bgcolor="ccffcc"
| 141 || September 8 || @ Indians || 6–5 || Charlton (4–6) || Mesa || — || 42,217 || 73–68
|- bgcolor="ffbbbb"
| 142 || September 10 || @ Royals || 2–4 || Rosado || Torres (1–2) || Bluma || 12,499 || 73–69
|- bgcolor="ffbbbb"
| 143 || September 11 || @ Royals || 2–4 || Linton || Moyer (4–2) || Bluma || 13,078 || 73–70
|- bgcolor="ccffcc"
| 144 || September 12 || @ Royals || 8–5 || Mulholland (4–2) || Haney || Charlton (16) || 15,045 || 74–70
|- bgcolor="ccffcc"
| 145 || September 13 || @ Twins || 13–7 || Wells (12–6) || Miller || — || 15,510 || 75–70
|- bgcolor="ccffcc"
| 146 || September 14 || @ Twins || 5–3 (10) || Ayala (6–3) || Guardado || Charlton (17) || 18,002 || 76–70
|- bgcolor="ccffcc"
| 147 || September 15 || @ Twins || 7–0 || Torres (2–2) || Robertson || — || 25,142 || 77–70
|- bgcolor="ccffcc"
| 148 || September 16 || Rangers || 6–0 || Moyer (5–2) || Burkett || — || 50,544 || 78–70
|- bgcolor="ccffcc"
| 149 || September 17 || Rangers || 5–2 || Mulholland (5–2) || Hill || Ayala (3) || 32,279 || 79–70
|- bgcolor="ccffcc"
| 150 || September 18 || Rangers || 5–2 || Hitchcock (13–8) || Witt || Charlton (18) || 35,162 || 80–70
|- bgcolor="ccffcc"
| 151 || September 19 || Rangers || 7–6 || Davis (2–2) || Cook || Charlton (19) || 39,769 || 81–70
|- bgcolor="ccffcc"
| 152 || September 20 || Athletics || 12–2 || Carmona (7–3) || Wengert || Meacham (1) || 56,535 || 82–70
|- bgcolor="ccffcc"
| 153 || September 21 || Athletics || 9–2 || Moyer (6–2) || Telgheder || — || 56,103 || 83–70
|- bgcolor="ffbbbb"
| 154 || September 22 || Athletics || 11–13 || Mohler || Mulholland (5–3) || Taylor || 54,194 || 83–71
|- bgcolor="ffbbbb"
| 155 || September 23 || @ Angels || 3–4 || Finley || Hitchcock (13–9) || Percival || 16,212 || 83–72
|- bgcolor="ffbbbb"
| 156 || September 24 || @ Angels || 6–11 || Springer || Wells (12–7) || — || 18,891 || 83–73
|- bgcolor="ccffcc"
| 157 || September 25 || @ Angels || 11–2 || Torres (3–2) || Boskie || — || 17,160 || 84–73
|- bgcolor="ffbbbb"
| 158 || September 26 || @ Athletics || 5–7 || Taylor || Charlton (4–7) || — || 11,141 || 84–74
|- bgcolor="ffbbbb"
| 159 || September 27 || @ Athletics || 1–8 || Telgheder || Mulholland (5–4) || — || 25,132 || 84–75
|- bgcolor="ccffcc"
| 160 || September 28 || @ Athletics || 5–3 (10) || Carmona (8–3) || Acre || Charlton (20) || 30,057 || 85–75
|- bgcolor="ffbbbb"
| 161 || September 29 || @ Athletics || 1–3 || Small || Torres (3–3) || Taylor || 34,462 || 85–76
|-

|-
| Legend:       = Win       = LossBold = Mariners team member

Detailed records

Notable transactions
 April 13, 1996: Félix Fermín was released by the Mariners.
 June 4, 1996: 1996 Major League Baseball Draft
Gil Meche was drafted by the Mariners in the 1st round (22nd pick). Player signed June 9, 1996.
Juan Pierre was drafted by the Mariners in the 48th round, but did not sign.
Sean Spencer was drafted by the Seattle Mariners in the 40th round of the 1996 amateur draft. Player signed August 26, 1996.
 August 1, 1996: Greg Pirkl was selected off waivers from the Mariners by the Boston Red Sox.
 August 14, 1996: Roger Blanco (minors) was traded by the Mariners to the Atlanta Braves for Mark Whiten.
 August 22, 1996: Luis Sojo was selected off waivers from the Mariners by the New York Yankees.
 August 29, 1996: The Mariners traded a player to be named later to the Minnesota Twins for Dave Hollins. The Mariners completed the deal by sending David Ortiz to the Twins on September 13.

Roster

Player stats

Batting

Starters by position
Note: Pos = Position; G = Games played; AB = At bats; H = Hits; Avg. = Batting average; HR = Home runs; RBI = Runs batted in

Other batters
Note: G = Games played; AB = At bats; H = Hits; Avg. = Batting average; HR = Home runs; RBI = Runs batted in

Pitching

Starting pitchers
Note: G = Games pitched; IP = Innings pitched; W = Wins; L = Losses; ERA = Earned run average; SO = Strikeouts

Other pitchers
Note: G = Games pitched; IP = Innings pitched; W = Wins; L = Losses; ERA = Earned run average; SO = Strikeouts

Relief pitchers
Note: G = Games pitched; W = Wins; L = Losses; SV = Saves; ERA = Earned run average; SO = Strikeouts

Awards and honors
Alex Rodriguez became the first shortstop in 56 years to win the American League Batting Crown.
Alex Rodriguez, American League Batting Champion

Farm system

References

External links
1996 Seattle Mariners at Baseball Reference
1996 Seattle Mariners team page at www.baseball-almanac.com

Seattle Mariners seasons
Seattle Mariners
Seattle Marin